Victoria was an electorate in the South Australian House of Assembly from 1857 until 1902 and from 1915 to 1993.

In 1902 the district was merged with Albert to create Victoria and Albert, but was separated again in 1915, electing candidates of both major parties at various times. However, after 1956, it was held by the Liberal and Country League and its successor, the Liberal Party, usually without serious difficulty. It was abolished in 1993 and replaced by the safe Liberal seat of MacKillop.

In 1860, the electorate had booths at Mosquito Plains, Mount Gambier, Penola and Robe. In 1865, it added Port MacDonnell, Bordertown, Kingston, South Australia and Wellington, and Naracoorte in 1868. In 1875, Bordertown, Kingston, Naracoorte, Robe and Wellington were transferred to the new electorate of Albert, and the new Victoria consisted of only Millicent, Mount Gambier, Penola, Port MacDonnell and Tarpeena. Booths were added at Beachport (1883), Tantanoola (1884), Furner (1893) and Kalangadoo (1896).

When the electorate was recreated in 1915, it had booths at Beachport, Bordertown, Conmurra, Frances, Furner, Glencoe, Glenroy, Hynam East, Kalangadoo, Keith, Kincraig, Kingston, Kongorong, Kybybolite, Lochaber, Lucindale, Mount Gambier, Millicent, Mundalla, Penola, Port MacDonnell, Reedy Creek, Rendelsham, Robe, Tantanoola, Wirrega, Wolseley and  Yale Paddock. It lost booths at Beachport, Hynam East,     Kongorong and Yale Paddock in 1918, but added booths at Hundred of Jessie, Mount McIntyre and Yahl.

In 1938, when it became a single-member district for the first time, Victoria lost a significant number of voters to the new seat of Mount Gambier: the new Victoria covered Beachport, Binnum, Bool Lagoon, Conmurra, Coonawarra, Frances, Furner, Glenroy, Hatherleigh, Hynam, Hundred of Jessie, Kalangadoo, Kingston, Kybybolite, Lochaber, Lucindale, Millicent, Mount Benson, Mount Burr, Mount McIntyre, Nangula, Naracoorte, Penola, Reedy Creek, Rendelsham, Robe and Tantanoola.

The seat of Millicent (1956-1977) came from the south of the seat of Victoria.

Members for Victoria

Election results

References

External links
1985 & 1989 election boundaries, page 18 & 19

Former electoral districts of South Australia